This is a list of the parliaments, general councils and conventions of the Estates of the Kingdom of Scotland.

See also

 List of Acts of the Parliament of Scotland to 1707
 List of parliaments of England
 List of parliaments of Ireland
 List of parliaments of the United Kingdom

References
 Margaret D. Young, The Parliaments of Scotland, volume 2 (Edinburgh, 1993). Appendix 1, pages 747–756.

Parliament of Scotland